In an attack on March 7, 2015, five people were shot dead and nine wounded in a restaurant on a busy street of Bamako, the capital of Mali. Two of those killed were Malians, and the others French and Belgian respectively.

Perpetrators
The jihadist group Al-Mourabitoun has claimed responsibility for the attack.

Shooting
On March 7, 2015, local police in Bamako, responded to an attack at La Terrace restaurant of Hippodrome district. The police department stated "This is a terrorist attack, although we're waiting for clarification. Provisionally, there are four dead – one French national, a Belgian and two Malians". Victims were taken to Gabriel Toure hospital.

Reactions
François Hollande, the President of France, condemned the attack as "cowardly". The French Foreign Minister, Laurent Fabius, said that France would strengthen Mali's resolve to "fight terrorism in all its forms". Didier Reynders, the Belgian Foreign Minister, also condemned the attack and said it may have been an act of terrorism.

References

2015 mass shootings in Africa
Mass murder in 2015
History of Bamako
Mass shootings in Africa
Terrorist incidents in Mali in 2015
Attacks on restaurants in Africa
Terrorist incidents attributed to al-Qaeda in the Islamic Maghreb
March 2015 events in Africa